Giovanni Nanni may refer to:

 Annio da Viterbo, Dominican friar and forger of documents
 Giovanni da Udine, painter